Dario Badinelli (born 10 August 1960) is a retired Italian triple jumper.

Career
Dario Badinelli won two medals, at senior level, at the International athletics competitions. He participated at one edition of the Summer Olympics (1984), he has 56 caps in national team from 1981 to 1993. He suffered from atrophy of the right arm, a characteristic that distinguished his jumping.

Achievements

National titles
He has won seventeen individual national championship titles.
10 wins in the triple jump (1983, 1985, 1985, 1986, 1987, 1988, 1989, 1990, 1991, 1992)
7 wins in the triple jump indoor (1984, 1985, 1988, 1989, 1990, 1991, 1992)

References

External links
 

1960 births
Living people
Olympic athletes of Italy
Athletes (track and field) at the 1984 Summer Olympics
Italian male triple jumpers
World Athletics Championships athletes for Italy
Sportspeople from the Province of Brescia
Mediterranean Games silver medalists for Italy
Mediterranean Games medalists in athletics
Athletes (track and field) at the 1983 Mediterranean Games
Italian Athletics Championships winners